The following is a list of ambassadors of the United States to Guyana. The current title given by the United States State Department to this position is Ambassador Extraordinary and Minister Plenipotentiary.

See also
Guyana – United States relations
Foreign relations of Guyana
Ambassadors of the United States

References

United States Department of State: Background notes on Guyana

External links
 United States Department of State: Chiefs of Mission for Guyana
 United States Department of State: Guyana
 United States Embassy in Georgetown

Guyana
Main
United States